The 2009 season is the 114th year in the club's history, the 98th season in Clube de Regatas do Flamengo's football existence, and their 39th in the Brazilian Série A, having never been relegated from the top division.

Other information

First-team squad
As of December, 2010, according to combined sources on the official website.

Players with Dual Nationality
   Juan

Transfer

In

Out

Competitions

Copa do Brasil

First round

Second round

Round of 16

Quarterfinals

Série A

Standings

Results summary

Pld=Matches played; W=Matches won; D=Matches drawn; L=Matches lost;

Results by round

Matches

See also
 Clube de Regatas do Flamengo

References

External links
 Flamengo official website (in Portuguese)
 2010 Copa Libertadores page Conmebol.com

Brazilian football clubs 2009 season
2009